Cortlandt Street Ferry Depot was the main ferry terminal of the Pennsylvania Railroad and the West Shore Railroad on the North River (Hudson River) in lower Manhattan. The railroads operated ferries to their terminal stations on the Hudson River waterfront in  New Jersey at Exchange Place and Weehawken, respectively.

The depot was next to Liberty Street Ferry Terminal from which the Central Railroad of New Jersey operated its Communipaw ferry to Communipaw Terminal.

History

As early as July 1764 a ferry began operating from Paulus Hook to Mesier's dock which was located at the foot of Courtland Street (where Cortlandt Street Ferry Depot would be built). Almost immediately and for several decades subsequently, a complicated series of legal battles broke out over who should operate the ferries, where the crossing(s) should be located and at what rate passengers and other cargo should be charged for the journey.

The first steam ferry service in the world began operations in 1812 between Paulus Hook and Manhattan and reduced the journey time to a then remarkable 14 minutes. With the arrival of the railroad station at Paulus Hook in 1834 and the arrival of the Morris and Essex Railroad service on October 14, 1836 the number of passengers and the value of the Jersey City Ferry continued to increase.

The terminal was located one block west of the Ninth Avenue Elevated's Cortlandt Street Station which operated from 1874 until 1940.

See also
Whitehall Terminal
Chambers Street Ferry Terminal
Liberty Street Ferry Terminal
Battery Park City Ferry Terminal

Gallery

References

Ferries of New York City
Water transportation in New York City
Ferry terminals in Manhattan
Demolished buildings and structures in Manhattan
1865 establishments in New York (state)
Pennsylvania Railroad
New York Central Railroad
Transit hubs serving New Jersey